The Rock 'n' Roll Denver Marathon was an annual marathon held in Denver, Colorado. Currently organised by Dalian Wanda 大连万达 of China, who and its predecessor, Competitor Group, took over management in 2010 of a race that first began in 2006, when nearly 1,200 people participated in the main marathon event. Additionally, over 1,700 took part in the half marathon that year. Other events include a four leg relay marathon and a kids race.

The marathon supports a number of charities, including the Colorado Neurological Institute and the American Council of the Blind. The 2007 Marathon took place at 8am on 14 October 2007.

No race occurred since 2020, but a virtual one took its place, and entrants were either refunded or deferred their entry to 2022.

Winners

Men
2006 Clint Wells, Superior, Colorado,  2:28:36
2007 Jonathan Ndambuki, Santa Fe, New Mexico, 2:21:34
2008 Jynocel Basweti, Santa Fe, New Mexico,  2:22:13
2009 Chris Siemers, Bensonville, Illinois,  2:23:03

Women
2006 Taeko Terauchi, Tokyo, Japan, 2:51:35
2007 Martha Tenorio, Boulder, Colorado, 2:46:41
2008 Nuta Olaru, Longmont, Colorado,  2:42:18

References

External links
Denvermarathon.com
Findamarathon.com - Denver Marathon

Marathons in the United States
2007 establishments in Colorado
Recurring sporting events established in 2007
Sports in Denver